Cologne is the largest city of the German western state of North Rhine-Westphalia (NRW) and the fourth-most populous city of Germany with 1.1 million inhabitants in the city proper and 3.6 million people in the urban region.

The city's medieval Catholic Cologne Cathedral is the third-tallest church and tallest cathedral in the world. It was constructed to house the Shrine of the Three Kings and is a globally recognized landmark and one of the most visited sights and pilgrimage destinations in Europe. The cityscape is further shaped by the Twelve Romanesque churches of Cologne, and Cologne is famous for Eau de Cologne, that has been produced in the city since 1709, and "cologne" has since come to be a generic term.

, the French version of the city's name, has become standard in English as well. During the Middle Ages the city flourished as being located on one of the most important major trade routes between east and western Europe (including the Brabant Road, Via Regia and Publica). Cologne was a free imperial city of the Holy Roman Empire and one of the major members of the trade union Hanseatic League. It was one of the largest European cities in medieval and renaissance times.

Prior to World War II, the city had undergone occupations by the French (1794–1815) and the British (1918–1926), and was part of Prussia beginning in 1815. Cologne was one of the most heavily bombed cities in Germany during World War II. The bombing reduced the population by 93% mainly due to evacuation, and destroyed almost the entire millennia-old city center. The post-war rebuilding has resulted in a very mixed cityscape, restoring only major historic landmarks like city gates and churches (31 of them being Romanesque).

Cologne is a major cultural center for the Rhineland; it hosts more than 30 museums and hundreds of galleries. There are many institutions of higher education, most notably the University of Cologne, one of Europe's oldest and largest universities; the Technical University of Cologne, Germany's largest university of applied sciences; and the German Sport University Cologne. It hosts three Max Planck science institutes and is a major research hub for the aerospace industry, with the German Aerospace Center and the European Astronaut Centre headquarters. It also has significant chemical and automobile industry. Cologne Bonn Airport is a regional hub, the main airport for the region being Düsseldorf Airport. The Cologne Trade Fair hosts a number of trade shows.

History

Roman Cologne

The first urban settlement on the grounds of modern-day Cologne was Oppidum Ubiorum, founded in 38 BCE by the Ubii, a Cisrhenian Germanic tribe. In 50 CE, the Romans founded Colonia Claudia Ara Agrippinensium (Cologne) on the river Rhine and the city became the provincial capital of Germania Inferior in 85 CE. Considerable Roman remains can be found in present-day Cologne, especially near the wharf area, where a 1,900-year-old Roman boat was discovered in late 2007. From 260 to 271, Cologne was the capital of the Gallic Empire under Postumus, Marius, and Victorinus. In 310, under emperor Constantine I, a bridge was built over the Rhine at Cologne. Roman imperial governors resided in the city and it became one of the most important trade and production centers in the Roman Empire north of the Alps. Cologne is shown on the 4th century Peutinger Map.

Maternus, who was elected as bishop in 313, was the first known bishop of Cologne. The city was the capital of a Roman province until it was occupied by the Ripuarian Franks in 462. Parts of the original Roman sewers are preserved underneath the city, with the new sewerage system having opened in 1890.

After the destruction of the Jewish temple in Jerusalem and the associated dispersion (diaspora) of the Jews, there is evidence of a Jewish community in Cologne. In 321 CE, Emperor Constantine approved the settlement of a Jewish community with all the freedoms of Roman citizens. It is assumed that it was located near the Marspforte within the city wall. The Edict of Constantine to the Jews is the oldest documented evidence in Germany.

Middle Ages
Early medieval Cologne was part of Austrasia within the Frankish Empire. Cunibert, made bishop of Cologne in 623, was an important advisor to the merovingian King Dagobert I and served with domesticus Pepin of Landen as tutor to the king's son and heir Siegebert III, the future king of Austrasia. In 716, Charles Martel commanded an army for the first time and suffered the only defeat of his life when Chilperic II, King of Neustria, invaded Austrasia and the city fell to him in the Battle of Cologne. Charles fled to the Eifel mountains, rallied supporters and took the city back that same year after defeating Chilperic in the Battle of Amblève. Cologne had been the seat of a bishop since the Roman period; under Charlemagne, in 795, bishop Hildebold was promoted to archbishop. In the 843 Treaty of Verdun Cologne fell into the dominion of Lothair I's Middle Francia – later called Lotharingia (Lower Lorraine).

In 953, the archbishops of Cologne first gained noteworthy secular power when bishop Bruno was appointed as duke by his brother Otto I, King of Germany. In order to weaken the secular nobility, who threatened his power, Otto endowed Bruno and his archiepiscopal successors with the prerogatives of secular princes, thus establishing the Electorate of Cologne, formed by the temporal possessions of the archbishopric and included in the end a strip of territory along the left Bank of the Rhine east of Jülich, as well as the Duchy of Westphalia on the other side of the Rhine, beyond Berg and Mark. By the end of the 12th century, the Archbishop of Cologne was one of the seven electors of the Holy Roman Emperor. Besides being prince elector, he was Archchancellor of Italy as well, technically from 1238 and permanently from 1263 until 1803.

Following the Battle of Worringen in 1288, Cologne gained its independence from the archbishops and became a Free City. Archbishop Sigfried II von Westerburg was forced to reside in Bonn. The archbishop nevertheless preserved the right of capital punishment. Thus the municipal council (though in strict political opposition towards the archbishop) depended upon him in all matters concerning criminal justice. This included torture, the sentence for which was only allowed to be handed down by the episcopal judge known as the "Greve". This legal situation lasted until the French conquest of Cologne.

Besides its economic and political significance Cologne also became an important centre of medieval pilgrimage, when Cologne's archbishop, Rainald of Dassel, gave the relics of the Three Wise Men to Cologne's cathedral in 1164 (after they, in fact, had been taken from Milan). Besides the three magi Cologne preserves the relics of Saint Ursula and Albertus Magnus.

Cologne's location on the river Rhine placed it at the intersection of the major trade routes between east and west as well as the main south–north Western Europe trade route, Venice to Netherlands; even by the mid-10th century, merchants in the town were already known for their prosperity and luxurious standard of living due to the availability of trade opportunities. The intersection of these trade routes were the basis of Cologne's growth. By the end of the 12th century, Archbishop Phillip von Heinsberg enclosed the entire city with walls. By 1300 the city population was 50,000–55,000. Cologne was a member of the Hanseatic League in 1475, when Frederick III confirmed the city's imperial immediacy. Cologne was so influential in regional commerce, that its systems of weights and measurements were used throughout Europe.

Early modern history

The economic structures of medieval and early modern Cologne were characterised by the city's status as a major harbour and transport hub on the Rhine. Craftsmanship was organised by self-administering guilds, some of which were exclusive to women.

As a free imperial city, Cologne was a self-ruling state within the Holy Roman Empire, an imperial estate with seat and vote at the Imperial Diet, and as such had the right (and obligation) to contribute to the defense of the Empire and maintain its own military force. As they wore a red uniform, these troops were known as the Rote Funken (red sparks). These soldiers were part of the Army of the Holy Roman Empire ("Reichskontingent"). They fought in the wars of the 17th and 18th century, including the wars against revolutionary France in which the small force was almost completely wiped out in combat. The tradition of these troops is preserved as a military persiflage by Cologne's most outstanding carnival society, the Rote Funken.

The Free Imperial City of Cologne must not be confused with the Electorate of Cologne which was a state of its own within the Holy Roman Empire. Since the second half of the 16th century the majority of archbishops were drawn from the Bavaria Wittelsbach dynasty. Due to the free status of Cologne, the archbishops were usually not allowed to enter the city. Thus they took up residence in Bonn and later in Brühl on the Rhine. As members of an influential and powerful family, and supported by their outstanding status as electors, the archbishops of Cologne repeatedly challenged and threatened the free status of Cologne during the 17th and 18th centuries, resulting in complicated affairs, which were handled by diplomatic means and propaganda as well as by the supreme courts of the Holy Roman Empire.

From the 19th century until World War II

Cologne lost its status as a free city during the French period. According to the Peace Treaty of Lunéville (1801) all the territories of the Holy Roman Empire on the left bank of the Rhine were officially incorporated into the French Republic (which had already occupied Cologne in 1794). Thus this region later became part of Napoleon's Empire. Cologne was part of the French Département Roer (named after the river Roer, German: Rur) with Aachen (French: Aix-la-Chapelle) as its capital. The French modernised public life, for example by introducing the Napoleonic code and removing the old elites from power. The Napoleonic code remained in use on the left bank of the Rhine until 1900, when a unified civil code (the Bürgerliches Gesetzbuch) was introduced in the German Empire. In 1815 at the Congress of Vienna, Cologne was made part of the Kingdom of Prussia, first in the Province of Jülich-Cleves-Berg and then the Rhine Province.

The permanent tensions between the Roman Catholic Rhineland and the overwhelmingly Protestant Prussian state repeatedly escalated with Cologne being in the focus of the conflict. In 1837 the archbishop of Cologne, Clemens August von Droste-Vischering, was arrested and imprisoned for two years after a dispute over the legal status of marriages between Protestants and Roman Catholics (Mischehenstreit). In 1874, during the Kulturkampf, Archbishop Paul Melchers was imprisoned before taking asylum in the Netherlands. These conflicts alienated the Catholic population from Berlin and contributed to a deeply felt anti-Prussian resentment, which was still significant after World War II, when the former mayor of Cologne, Konrad Adenauer, became the first West German chancellor.

During the 19th and 20th centuries, Cologne absorbed numerous surrounding towns, and by World War I had already grown to 700,000 inhabitants. Industrialisation changed the city and spurred its growth. Vehicle and engine manufacturing was especially successful, though the heavy industry was less ubiquitous than in the Ruhr area. The cathedral, started in 1248 but abandoned around 1560, was eventually finished in 1880 not just as a place of worship but also as a German national monument celebrating the newly founded German empire and the continuity of the German nation since the Middle Ages. Some of this urban growth occurred at the expense of the city's historic heritage with much being demolished (for example, the city walls or the area around the cathedral) and sometimes replaced by contemporary buildings.

Cologne was designated as one of the Fortresses of the German Confederation. It was turned into a heavily armed fortress (opposing the French and Belgian fortresses of Verdun and Liège) with two fortified belts surrounding the city, the remains of which can be seen to this day. The military demands on what became Germany's largest fortress presented a significant obstacle to urban development, with forts, bunkers, and wide defensive dugouts completely encircling the city and preventing expansion; this resulted in a very densely built-up area within the city itself.

During World War I Cologne was the target of several minor air raids but suffered no significant damage. Cologne was occupied by the British Army of the Rhine until 1926, under the terms of the Armistice and the subsequent Versailles Peace Treaty. In contrast with the harsh behaviour of the French occupation troops in Germany, the British forces were more lenient to the local population. Konrad Adenauer, the mayor of Cologne from 1917 until 1933 and later a West German chancellor, acknowledged the political impact of this approach, especially since Britain had opposed French demands for a permanent Allied occupation of the entire Rhineland.

As part of the demilitarisation of the Rhineland, the city's fortifications had to be dismantled. This was an opportunity to create two green belts (Grüngürtel) around the city by converting the fortifications and their fields of fire into large public parks. This was not completed until 1933. In 1919 the University of Cologne, closed by the French in 1798, was reopened. This was considered to be a replacement for the loss of the University of Strasbourg on the west bank of the Rhine, which reverted to France with the rest of Alsace. Cologne prospered during the Weimar Republic (1919–33), and progress was made especially in public governance, city planning, housing and social affairs. Social housing projects were considered exemplary and were copied by other German cities. Cologne competed to host the Olympics, and a modern sports stadium was erected at Müngersdorf. When the British occupation ended, the prohibition of civil aviation was lifted and Cologne Butzweilerhof Airport soon became a hub for national and international air traffic, second in Germany only to Berlin Tempelhof Airport.

The democratic parties lost the local elections in Cologne in March 1933 to the Nazi Party and other extreme-right parties. The Nazis then arrested the Communist and Social Democrats members of the city assembly, and Mayor Adenauer was dismissed. Compared to some other major cities, however, the Nazis never gained decisive support in Cologne. (Significantly, the number of votes cast for the Nazi Party in Reichstag elections had always been the national average.) By 1939 the population had risen to 772,221 inhabitants.

World War II

During World War II, Cologne was a Military Area Command Headquarters for Wehrkreis VI (headquartered at Münster). Cologne was under the command of Lieutenant-General Freiherr Roeder von Diersburg, who was responsible for military operations in Bonn, Siegburg, Aachen, Jülich, Düren, and Monschau. Cologne was home to the 211th Infantry Regiment and the 26th Artillery Regiment.

The Allies dropped 44,923.2 tons of bombs on the city during World War II, destroying 61% of its built up area. During the Bombing of Cologne in World War II, Cologne endured 262 air raids by the Western Allies, which caused approximately 20,000 civilian casualties and almost completely wiped out the central part of the city. During the night of 31 May 1942, Cologne was the target of "Operation Millennium", the first 1,000 bomber raid by the Royal Air Force in World War II. 1,046 heavy bombers attacked their target with 1,455 tons of explosives, approximately two-thirds of which were incendiary. This raid lasted about 75 minutes, destroyed  of built-up area (61%), killed 486 civilians and made 59,000 people homeless. The devastation was recorded by Hermann Claasen from 1942 until the end of the war, and presented in his exhibition and book of 1947 Singing in the furnace. Cologne – Remains of an old city.

Cologne was taken by the American First Army in early March 1945 during the Invasion of Germany after a battle. By the end of the war, the population of Cologne had been reduced by 95%. This loss was mainly caused by a massive evacuation of the people to more rural areas. The same happened in many other German cities in the last two years of war. By the end of 1945, however, the population had already recovered to approximately 450,000. By the end of the war, essentially all of Cologne's pre-war Jewish population of 11,000 had been deported or killed by the Nazis. The six synagogues of the city were destroyed. The synagogue on Roonstraße was rebuilt in 1959.

Post-war Cologne and Cold War era

Despite Cologne's status as the largest city in the region, nearby Düsseldorf was chosen as the political capital of the federated state of North Rhine-Westphalia. With Bonn being chosen as the provisional federal capital (provisorische Bundeshauptstadt) and seat of the government of the Federal Republic of Germany (then informally West Germany), Cologne benefited by being sandwiched between two important political centres. The city became–and still is–home to a number of federal agencies and organizations. After reunification in 1990, Berlin was made the capital of Germany.

In 1945 architect and urban planner Rudolf Schwarz called Cologne the "world's greatest heap of rubble". Schwarz designed the master plan for reconstruction in 1947, which included the construction of several new thoroughfares through the city centre, especially the Nord-Süd-Fahrt ("North-South-Drive"). The master plan took into consideration the fact that even shortly after the war a large increase in automobile traffic could be anticipated. Plans for new roads had already, to a certain degree, evolved under the Nazi administration, but the actual construction became easier when most of the city centre was in ruins.

The destruction of 95% of the city centre, including the famous Twelve Romanesque churches such as St. Gereon, Great St. Martin, St. Maria im Kapitol and several other monuments in World War II, meant a tremendous loss of cultural treasures. The rebuilding of those churches and other landmarks such as the Gürzenich event hall was not undisputed among leading architects and art historians at that time, but in most cases, civil intention prevailed. The reconstruction lasted until the 1990s, when the Romanesque church of St. Kunibert was finished.

In 1959, the city's population reached pre-war numbers again. It then grew steadily, exceeding 1 million for about one year from 1975. It remained just below that until mid-2010, when it exceeded 1 million again.

Post-reunification

In the 1980s and 1990s Cologne's economy prospered for two main reasons. The first was the growth in the number of media companies, both in the private and public sectors; they are especially catered for in the newly developed Media Park, which creates a strong visual focal point in Cologne's city centre and includes the KölnTurm, one of Cologne's most prominent high-rise buildings. The second was the permanent improvement of the diverse traffic infrastructure, which made Cologne one of the most easily accessible metropolitan areas in Central Europe.

Due to the economic success of the Cologne Trade Fair, the city arranged a large extension to the fair site in 2005. At the same time the original buildings, which date back to the 1920s, were rented out to RTL, Germany's largest private broadcaster, as their new corporate headquarters.

Cologne was the focus of the 2015-16 New Year's Eve sexual assaults in Germany, with over 500 women reporting that they were sexually assaulted by persons of African and Arab appearance.

Geography
The city of Cologne lies within the larger area of the Cologne Lowland, a cone-shaped area of the central Rhineland that lies between Bonn, Aachen and Düsseldorf.

Districts

Cologne is divided into 9 boroughs (Stadtbezirke) and 85 districts (Stadtteile):

Climate
Located in the Rhine-Ruhr area, Cologne is one of the warmest cities in Germany. It has a temperate–oceanic climate (Köppen: Cfb) with cool winters and warm summers. It is also one of the cloudiest cities in Germany, with just 1,567.5 hours of sun a year. Especially the inner urban neighbourhoods experience a greater number of hot days, as well as significantly higher temperatures during nighttime compared to the surrounding area (including the airport, where temperatures are classified). Still temperatures can vary noticeably over the course of a month with warmer and colder weather. Precipitation is spread evenly throughout the year with a light peak in summer due to showers and thunderstorms.

Flood protection

Cologne is regularly affected by flooding from the Rhine and is considered the most flood-prone European city. A city agency (Stadtentwässerungsbetriebe Köln, "Cologne Urban Drainage Operations") manages an extensive flood control system which includes both permanent and mobile flood walls, protection from rising waters for buildings close to the river banks, monitoring and forecasting systems, pumping stations and programmes to create or protect floodplains, and river embankments. The system was redesigned after a 1993 flood, which resulted in heavy damage.

Demographics

In the Roman Empire, the city was large and rich with a population of 40,000 in 100–200 AD. The city was home to around 20,000 people in 1000 AD, growing to 50,000 in 1200 AD. The Rhineland metropolis still had 50,000 residents in 1300 AD.

Cologne is the fourth-largest city in Germany after Berlin, Hamburg and Munich. It is part of the polycentric megacity region Rhine-Ruhr with a population of over 11,000,000 people.

There were 551,528 women and 527,773 men in Cologne. In 2021, there were 11,127 births in Cologne; 5,844 marriages and 1,808 divorces, and 10,536 deaths. In the city, the population was spread out, with 16.3% under the age of 18, and 17.8% were 65 years of age or older. 203 people in Cologne were over the age of 100.

According to the Statistical Office of the City of Cologne, the number of people with a migrant background is at 40.5% (436,660). 2,254 people acquired German citizenship in 2021. In 2021, there were 559,854 households, of which 18.4% had children under the age of 18; 51% of all households were made up of singles. 8% of all households were single-parent households. The average household size was 1.88.

Residents with foreign citizenship
Cologne residents with a foreign citizenship as of 31 December 2021 is as follows:

Turkish community
Cologne is home to 90,000 people of Turkish origin and is the second largest German city with Turkish population after Berlin. Cologne has a Little Istanbul in Keupstraße that has many Turkish restaurants and markets. Famous Turkish-German people like rapper Eko Fresh and TV presenter Nazan Eckes were born in Cologne.

Language

Colognian or Kölsch (natively Kölsch Platt) is a small set of very closely related dialects, or variants, of the Ripuarian Central German group of languages. These dialects are spoken in the area covered by the Archdiocese and former Electorate of Cologne reaching from Neuss in the north to just south of Bonn, west to Düren and east to Olpe in the North-West of Germany. Kölsch is one of the very few city dialects in Germany, which also include the dialect spoken in Berlin, for example.

Religion
As of 2015, 35.5% of the population belonged to the Catholic Church, the largest religious body, and 15.5% to the Evangelical Church. Irenaeus of Lyons claimed that Christianity was brought to Cologne by Roman soldiers and traders at an unknown early date. It is known that in the early second century it was a bishop's seat. The first historical Bishop of Cologne was Saint Maternus. Thomas Aquinas studied in Cologne in 1244 under Albertus Magnus. Cologne is the seat of the Roman Catholic Archdiocese of Cologne.

According to the 2011 census, 2.1% of the population was Eastern Orthodox, 0.5% was member of an Evangelical Free Church and 4.2% belonged to further religious communities officially recognized by the state of North Rhine-Westphalia (such as Jehovah's Witnesses).

There are several mosques, including the Cologne Central Mosque run by the Turkish-Islamic Union for Religious Affairs. In 2011, about 11.2% of the population was Muslim.

Cologne also has one of the oldest and largest Jewish communities in Germany. In 2011, 0.3% of Cologne's population was Jewish.

On 11 October 2021, the Mayor of Cologne Henriette Reker, announced that all of Cologne's 35 mosques would be allowed to broadcast the Adhan (prayer call) for up to five minutes on Fridays between noon and 3 p.m. She commented that the move “shows that diversity is appreciated and loved in Cologne.”

Government and politics

The city's administration is headed by the mayor and the three deputy mayors.

Political traditions and developments
The long tradition of a free imperial city, which long dominated an exclusively Catholic population and the age-old conflict between the church and the bourgeoisie (and within it between the patricians and craftsmen) have created its own political climate in Cologne. Various interest groups often form networks beyond party boundaries. The resulting web of relationships, with political, economic, and cultural links with each other in a system of mutual favours, obligations and dependencies, is called the 'Cologne coterie'. This has often led to an unusual proportional distribution in the city government and degenerated at times into corruption: in 1999, a "waste scandal" over kickbacks and illegal campaign contributions came to light, which led not only to the imprisonment of the entrepreneur Hellmut Trienekens, but also to the downfall of almost the entire leadership of the ruling Social Democrats.

Mayor

The current Lord Mayor of Cologne is Henriette Reker. She received 52.66% of the vote at the municipal election on 17 October 2015, running as an independent with the support of the CDU, FDP, and Greens. She took office on 15 December 2015. Reker was re-elected to a second term in a runoff election on 27 September 2020, in which she received 59.27% of the vote.

The most recent mayoral election was held on 13 September 2020, with a runoff held on 27 September, and the results were as follows:

! rowspan=2 colspan=2| Candidate
! rowspan=2| Party
! colspan=2| First round
! colspan=2| Second round
|-
! Votes
! %
! Votes
! %
|-
| bgcolor=| 
| align=left| Henriette Reker
| align=left| Independent (Green/CDU)
| 187,389
| 45.1
| 174,263
| 59.3
|-
| bgcolor=| 
| align=left| Andreas Kossiski
| align=left| Social Democratic Party
| 111,353
| 26.8
| 119,753
| 40.7
|-
| bgcolor=| 
| align=left| Jörg Detjen
| align=left| The Left
| 29,810
| 7.2
|-
| bgcolor=| 
| align=left| Olivier Fuchs
| align=left| Volt Germany
| 18,520
| 4.5
|-
| bgcolor=| 
| align=left| Christer Cremer
| align=left| Alternative for Germany
| 17,441
| 4.2
|-
| 
| align=left| Nicolin Gabrysch
| align=left| Climate Friends
| 14,370
| 3.5
|-
| bgcolor=| 
| align=left| Roberto Campione
| align=left| Independent
| 14,122
| 3.4
|-
| 
| align=left| Thor Zimmermann
| align=left| Good Cologne
| 8,613
| 2.1
|-
| 
| align=left| Dagmar Langel
| align=left| We Are Cologne
| 4,464
| 1.1
|-
| bgcolor=| 
| align=left| Robert Nussholz
| align=left| Independent
| 4,044
| 1.0
|-
| bgcolor=| 
| align=left| Sabine Neumeyer
| align=left| Independent
| 2,547
| 0.6
|-
| bgcolor=| 
| align=left| Rüdiger-René Keune
| align=left| Ecological Democratic Party
| 2,336
| 0.6
|-
| bgcolor=| 
| align=left| Martin Przybylski
| align=left| Independent
| 924
| 0.2
|-
! colspan=3| Valid votes
! 415,933
! 98.7
! 294,016
! 99.1
|-
! colspan=3| Invalid votes
! 5,633
! 1.3
! 2,727
! 0.9
|-
! colspan=3| Total
! 421,566
! 100.0
! 296,743
! 100.0
|-
! colspan=3| Electorate/voter turnout
! 820,527
! 51.4
! 818,731
! 36.2
|-
| colspan=7| Source: City of Cologne (1st round, 2nd round)
|}

City council

The Cologne city council (Kölner Stadtrat) governs the city alongside the Mayor. It serves a term of five years. The most recent city council election was held on 13 September 2020, and the results were as follows:

! colspan=2| Party
! Votes
! %
! +/-
! Seats
! +/-
|-
| bgcolor=| 
| align=left| Alliance 90/The Greens (Grüne)
| 118,997
| 28.5
|  9.0
| 26
|  8
|-
| bgcolor=| 
| align=left| Social Democratic Party (SPD)
| 90,040
| 21.6
|  7.8
| 19
|  7
|-
| bgcolor=| 
| align=left| Christian Democratic Union (CDU)
| 89,659
| 21.5
|  5.7
| 19
|  6
|-
| bgcolor=| 
| align=left| The Left (Die Linke)
| 27,044
| 6.5
|  0.4
| 6
| ±0
|-
| bgcolor=| 
| align=left| Free Democratic Party (FDP)
| 21,965
| 5.3
|  0.2
| 5
| ±0
|-
| bgcolor=| 
| align=left| Volt Germany (Volt)
| 20,783
| 5.0
| New
| 4
| New
|-
| bgcolor=| 
| align=left| Alternative for Germany (AfD)
| 18,272
| 4.4
|  0.8
| 4
|  1
|-
| bgcolor=| 
| align=left| Die PARTEI (PARTEI)
| 10,261
| 2.5
|  2.4
| 2
|  2
|-
| 
| align=left| Climate Friends (Klima Freunde)
| 8,383
| 2.0
|  0.0
| 2
| ±0
|-
| 
| align=left| Good Cologne (GUT)
| 8,298
| 2.0
|  0.6
| 2
| ±0
|-
| bgcolor=| 
| align=left| Free Voters Cologne (FWK)
| 2,501
| 0.6
|  0.2
| 1
| ±0
|-
| colspan=7 bgcolor=lightgrey| 
|-
| bgcolor=| 
| align=left| Ecological Democratic Party (ÖDP)
| 374
| 0.1
| New
| 0
| New
|-
| 
| align=left| We Are Cologne 2020 (Wir Sind Köln)
| 265
| 0.1
| New
| 0
| New
|-
| 
| align=left| Independent A. Krause
| 107
| 0.0
| New
| 0
| New
|-
| 
| align=left| Independent Neumeyer
| 72
| 0.0
| New
| 0
| New
|-
| 
| align=left| Independent Weber
| 72
| 0.0
| New
| 0
| New
|-
| 
| align=left| Independent R. Krause
| 71
| 0.0
| New
| 0
| New
|-
| 
| align=left| Independent Schidlowsky
| 32
| 0.0
| New
| 0
| New
|-
| 
| align=left| Party of Progress (PdF)
| 31
| 0.0
| New
| 0
| New
|-
! colspan=2| Valid votes
! 417,227
! 98.9
! 
! 
! 
|-
! colspan=2| Invalid votes
! 4,596
! 1.1
! 
! 
! 
|-
! colspan=2| Total
! 421,823
! 100.0
! 
! 90
! ±0
|-
! colspan=2| Electorate/voter turnout
! 820,526
! 51.4
!  1.8
! 
! 
|-
| colspan=7| Source: City of Cologne
|}

State Landtag

In the Landtag of North Rhine-Westphalia, Cologne is divided between seven constituencies. After the 2022 North Rhine-Westphalia state election, the composition and representation of each was as follows:

Federal parliament 
In the Bundestag, Cologne is divided between four constituencies. In the 20th Bundestag, the composition and representation of each was as follows:

Cityscape

The inner city of Cologne was largely destroyed during World War II. The reconstruction of the city followed the style of the 1950s, while respecting the old layout and naming of the streets. Thus, the city centre today is characterized by modern architecture, with a few interspersed pre-war buildings which were reconstructed due to their historical importance. Some buildings of the "Wiederaufbauzeit" (era of reconstruction), for example, the opera house by Wilhelm Riphahn, are nowadays regarded as classics of modern architecture. Nevertheless, the uncompromising style of the Cologne Opera house and other modern buildings has remained controversial.

Wildlife
The presence of animals in Cologne is generally limited to insects, small rodents, and several species of birds. Pigeons are the most often seen animals in Cologne, although the number of birds is augmented each year by a growing population of feral exotics, most visibly parrots such as the rose-ringed parakeet. The sheltered climate in southeast Northrhine-Westphalia allows these birds to survive through the winter, and in some cases, they are displacing native species. The plumage of Cologne's green parrots is highly visible even from a distance, and contrasts starkly with the otherwise muted colours of the cityscape.

Tourism
Cologne had 5.8 million overnight stays booked and 3.35 million arrivals in 2016.

Landmarks

Churches
 Cologne Cathedral (German: Kölner Dom) is the city's most famous monument and the Cologne residents' most loved landmark. It is a Gothic church, started in 1248, and completed in 1880. In 1996, it was designated a World Heritage Site; it houses the Shrine of the Three Kings, which supposedly contains the relics of the Three Magi (see also). Residents of Cologne sometimes refer to the cathedral as "the eternal construction site" (die ewige Baustelle).
 Twelve Romanesque churches: These buildings are outstanding examples of medieval church architecture. The origins of some of the churches go back as far as Roman times, for example St. Gereon, which was originally a chapel in a Roman graveyard. With the exception of St. Maria Lyskirchen all of these churches were very badly damaged during World War II. Reconstruction was only finished in the 1990s.

Medieval houses
The Cologne City Hall (Kölner Rathaus), founded in the 12th century, is the oldest city hall in Germany still in use. The Renaissance-style loggia and tower were added in the 15th century. Other famous buildings include the Gürzenich, Haus Saaleck and the Overstolzenhaus.

Medieval city gates

Of the twelve medieval city gates that once existed, only the Eigelsteintorburg at Ebertplatz, the Hahnentor at Rudolfplatz and the Severinstorburg at Chlodwigplatz still stand today.

Streets

 The Cologne Ring boulevards (such as Hohenzollernring, Kaiser-Wilhelm-Ring, Hansaring) with their medieval city gates (such as Hahnentorburg on Rudolfplatz) are also known for their night life.
 Hohe Straße (literally: High Street) is one of the main shopping areas and extends past the cathedral in an approximately southerly direction. The street contains many gift shops, clothing stores, fast food restaurants and electronic goods dealers.
 Schildergasse – connects Neumarkt square at its western end to the Hohe Strasse shopping street at its eastern end and has been named the busiest shopping street in Europe with 13,000 people passing through every hour, according to a 2008 study by GfK.
 Ehrenstraße – the shopping area around Apostelnstrasse, Ehrenstrasse, and Rudolfplatz is a little more on the quirky and stylish side.

Bridges
Several bridges cross the Rhine in Cologne. They are (from south to north): the Cologne Rodenkirchen Bridge, South Bridge (railway), Severin Bridge, Deutz Bridge, Hohenzollern Bridge (railway), Zoo Bridge (Zoobrücke) and Cologne Mülheim Bridge. In particular the iron tied arch Hohenzollern Bridge (Hohenzollernbrücke) is a dominant landmark along the river embankment. A Rhine crossing of a special kind is provided by the Cologne Cable Car (German: Kölner Seilbahn), a cableway that runs across the Rhine between the Cologne Zoological Garden in Riehl and the Rheinpark in Deutz.

High-rise structures
The observation deck has been closed since 1992. A selection of the tallest buildings in Cologne is listed below. Other tall structures include the Hansahochhaus (designed by architect Jacob Koerfer and completed in 1925 – it was at one time Europe's tallest office building), the Kranhaus buildings at Rheinauhafen, and the Messeturm Köln ("trade fair tower").

Culture

Cologne has several museums. The famous Roman-Germanic Museum features art and architecture from the city's distant past; the Museum Ludwig houses one of the most important collections of modern art in Europe, including a Picasso collection matched only by the museums in Barcelona and Paris. The Museum Schnütgen of religious art is partly housed in St. Cecilia, one of Cologne's Twelve Romanesque churches.
Many art galleries in Cologne enjoy a worldwide reputation like e.g. Galerie Karsten Greve, one of the leading galleries for postwar and contemporary art.

Cologne has more than 60 music venues and the third-highest density of music venues of Germany's four largest cities, after Munich and Hamburg and ahead of Berlin.

Several orchestras are active in the city, among them the Gürzenich Orchestra, which is also the orchestra of the Cologne Opera and the WDR Symphony Orchestra Cologne (German State Radio Orchestra), both based at the Cologne Philharmonic Orchestra Building (Kölner Philharmonie). Other orchestras are the Musica Antiqua Köln and the WDR Rundfunkorchester Köln, and several choirs, including the WDR Rundfunkchor Köln. Cologne was also an important hotbed for electronic music in the 1950s (Studio für elektronische Musik, Karlheinz Stockhausen) and again from the 1990s onward. The public radio and TV station WDR was involved in promoting musical movements such as Krautrock in the 1970s; the influential Can was formed there in 1968. There are several centres of nightlife, among them the Kwartier Latäng (the student quarter around the Zülpicher Straße) and the nightclub-studded areas around Hohenzollernring, Friesenplatz and Rudolfplatz.

The large annual literary festival  with its  features regional and international authors. The main literary figure connected with Cologne is the writer Heinrich Böll, winner of the Nobel Prize for Literature. Since 2012, there is also an annual international festival of philosophy called .

The city also has the most pubs per capita in Germany. Cologne is well known for its beer, called Kölsch. Kölsch is also the name of the local dialect. This has led to the common joke of Kölsch being the only language one can drink.

Cologne is also famous for Eau de Cologne (German: Kölnisch Wasser; lit: "Water of Cologne"), a perfume created by Italian expatriate Johann Maria Farina at the beginning of the 18th century. During the 18th century, this perfume became increasingly popular, was exported all over Europe by the Farina family and Farina became a household name for Eau de Cologne. In 1803 Wilhelm Mülhens entered into a contract with an unrelated person from Italy named Carlo Francesco Farina who granted him the right to use his family name and Mühlens opened a small factory at Cologne's Glockengasse. In later years, and after various court battles, his grandson Ferdinand Mülhens was forced to abandon the name Farina for the company and their product. He decided to use the house number given to the factory at Glockengasse during the French occupation in the early 19th century, 4711. Today, original Eau de Cologne is still produced in Cologne by both the Farina family, currently in the eighth generation, and by Mäurer & Wirtz who bought the 4711 brand in 2006.

Carnival
The Cologne carnival is one of the largest street festivals in Europe. In Cologne, the carnival season officially starts on 11 November at 11 minutes past 11 a.m. with the proclamation of the new Carnival Season, and continues until Ash Wednesday. However, the so-called "Tolle Tage" (crazy days) do not start until Weiberfastnacht (Women's Carnival) or, in dialect, Wieverfastelovend, the Thursday before Ash Wednesday, which is the beginning of the street carnival. Zülpicher Strasse and its surroundings, Neumarkt square, Heumarkt and all bars and pubs in the city are crowded with people in costumes dancing and drinking in the streets. Hundreds of thousands of visitors flock to Cologne during this time. Generally, around a million people celebrate in the streets on the Thursday before Ash Wednesday.

Rivalry with Düsseldorf
Cologne and Düsseldorf have a "fierce regional rivalry", which includes carnival parades, football, and beer. People in Cologne prefer Kölsch while people in Düsseldorf prefer Altbier ("Alt"). Waiters and patrons will "scorn" and make a "mockery" of people who order Alt beer in Cologne or Kölsch in Düsseldorf. The rivalry has been described as a "love–hate relationship". The Koln Guild of Brewers was established in 1396. The Kolsch beer style first appeared in the 1800s and in 1986 the breweries established an appellation under which only breweries in the city are allowed to use the term Kolsch.

Museums

 Farina Fragrance Museum – birthplace of Eau de Cologne
 Römisch-Germanisches Museum (Roman-Germanic Museum) – ancient Roman and Germanic culture
 Wallraf-Richartz Museum – European painting from the 13th to the early 20th century
 Museum Ludwig – modern art
 Museum Schnütgen – medieval art
 Museum für Angewandte Kunst – applied art
 Kolumba Kunstmuseum des Erzbistums Köln (art museum of the Archbishopric of Cologne) – modern art museum built around medieval ruins of St. Kolumba, Cologne, completed 2007
 Cathedral Treasury "Domschatzkammer" – historic underground vaults of the Cathedral
 EL-DE Haus – former local headquarters of the Gestapo houses a museum documenting Nazi rule in Cologne with a special focus on the persecution of political dissenters and minorities
 German Sports and Olympic Museum – exhibitions about sports from antiquity until the present
 Imhoff-Schokoladenmuseum – Chocolate Museum
 Geomuseum of the University of Cologne – the exhibition includes fossils (such as dinosaur bones and the skeleton of an Eryops), stones and minerals
 Forum for Internet Technology in Contemporary Art – collections of Internet-based art, corporate part of (NewMediaArtProjectNetwork):cologne, the experimental platform for art and New Media
 Flora und Botanischer Garten Köln – the city's formal park and main botanical garden
 Forstbotanischer Garten Köln – an arboretum and woodland botanical garden

Music fairs and festivals
The city was home to the internationally famous Ringfest, and now to the C/o pop festival.

In addition, Cologne enjoys a thriving Christmas Market (Weihnachtsmarkt) presence with several locations in the city.

Economy

As the largest city in the Rhine-Ruhr metropolitan region, Cologne benefits from a large market structure. In competition with Düsseldorf, the economy of Cologne is primarily based on insurance and media industries, while the city is also an important cultural and research centre and home to a number of corporate headquarters.

Among the largest media companies based in Cologne are Westdeutscher Rundfunk, RTL Television (with subsidiaries), n-tv, Deutschlandradio, Brainpool TV and publishing houses like J. P. Bachem, Taschen, Tandem Verlag, and M. DuMont Schauberg. Several clusters of media, arts and communications agencies, TV production studios, and state agencies work partly with private and government-funded cultural institutions. Among the insurance companies based in Cologne are Central, DEVK, DKV, Generali Deutschland, Gen Re, Gothaer, HDI Gerling and national headquarters of AXA Insurance, Mitsui Sumitomo Insurance Group and Zurich Financial Services.

The German flag carrier Lufthansa and its subsidiary Lufthansa CityLine have their main corporate headquarters in Cologne. The largest employer in Cologne is Ford Europe, which has its European headquarters and a factory in Niehl (Ford-Werke GmbH). Toyota Motorsport GmbH (TMG), Toyota's official motorsports team, responsible for Toyota rally cars, and then Formula One cars, has its headquarters and workshops in Cologne. Other large companies based in Cologne include the REWE Group, TÜV Rheinland, Deutz AG and a number of Kölsch breweries. The largest three Kölsch breweries of Cologne are Reissdorf, Gaffel, and Früh.

Historically, Cologne has always been an important trade city, with land, air, and sea connections. The city has five Rhine ports, the second largest inland port in Germany and one of the largest in Europe. Cologne-Bonn Airport is the second largest freight terminal in Germany. Today, the Cologne trade fair (Koelnmesse) ranks as a major European trade fair location with over 50 trade fairs and other large cultural and sports events. In 2008 Cologne had 4.31 million overnight stays booked and 2.38 million arrivals. Cologne's largest daily newspaper is the Kölner Stadt-Anzeiger.

Cologne shows a significant increase in startup companies, especially when considering digital business.

Cologne has also become the first German city with a population of more than a million people to declare climate emergency.

Transport

Road transport

Road building had been a major issue in the 1920s under the leadership of mayor Konrad Adenauer. The first German limited-access road was constructed after 1929 between Cologne and Bonn. Today, this is the Bundesautobahn 555. In 1965, Cologne became the first German city to be fully encircled by a motorway ring road. Roughly at the same time, a city centre bypass (Stadtautobahn) was planned, but only partially put into effect, due to opposition by environmental groups. The completed section became Bundesstraße ("Federal Road") B 55a, which begins at the Zoobrücke ("Zoo Bridge") and meets with A 4 and A 3 at the interchange Cologne East. Nevertheless, it is referred to as Stadtautobahn by most locals. In contrast to this, the Nord-Süd-Fahrt ("North-South-Drive") was actually completed, a new four/six-lane city centre through-route, which had already been anticipated by planners such as Fritz Schumacher in the 1920s. The last section south of Ebertplatz was completed in 1972.

In 2005, the first stretch of an eight-lane motorway in North Rhine-Westphalia was opened to traffic on Bundesautobahn 3, part of the eastern section of the Cologne Beltway between the interchanges Cologne East and Heumar.

Cycling

Compared to other German cities, Cologne has a traffic layout that is not very bicycle-friendly. It has repeatedly ranked among the worst in an independent evaluation conducted by the Allgemeiner Deutscher Fahrrad-Club. In 2014 it ranked 36th out of 39 German cities with a population greater than 200,000.

Rail transport
Cologne has a railway service with Deutsche Bahn InterCity and ICE-trains stopping at Köln Hauptbahnhof (Cologne Main Station), Köln Messe/Deutz and Cologne/Bonn Airport. ICE and TGV Thalys high-speed trains link Cologne with Amsterdam, Brussels (in 1h47, 9 departures/day) and Paris (in 3h14, 6 departures/day). There are frequent ICE trains to other German cities, including Frankfurt am Main and Berlin. ICE Trains to London via the Channel Tunnel were planned for 2013.

The Cologne Stadtbahn operated by Kölner Verkehrsbetriebe (KVB) is an extensive light rail system that is partially underground and serves Cologne and a number of neighbouring cities. It evolved from the tram system. Nearby Bonn is linked by both the Stadtbahn and main line railway trains, and occasional recreational boats on the Rhine. Düsseldorf is also linked by S-Bahn trains, which are operated by Deutsche Bahn.

The Rhine-Ruhr S-Bahn has 5 lines which cross Cologne. The S13/S19 runs 24/7 between Cologne Hbf and Cologne/Bonn airport.

There are also frequent buses covering most of the city and surrounding suburbs, and Eurolines coaches to London via Brussels.

Water transport
Häfen und Güterverkehr Köln (Ports and Goods traffic Cologne, HGK) is one of the largest operators of inland ports in Germany. Ports include Köln-Deutz, Köln-Godorf, and Köln-Niehl I and II.

Air transport
Cologne's international airport is Cologne/Bonn Airport (CGN). It is also called Konrad Adenauer Airport after Germany's first post-war Chancellor Konrad Adenauer, who was born in the city and was mayor of Cologne from 1917 until 1933. The airport is shared with the neighbouring city of Bonn. Cologne is headquarters to the European Aviation Safety Agency (EASA).

Education
Cologne is home to numerous universities and colleges, and host to some 72,000 students. Its oldest university, the University of Cologne (founded in 1388) is the largest university in Germany, as the Cologne University of Applied Sciences is the largest university of Applied Sciences in the country. The Cologne University of Music and Dance is the largest conservatory in Europe. Foreigners can have German lessons in the VHS (Adult Education Centre).

Lauder Morijah School, a Jewish school in Cologne, previously closed. After Russian immigration increased the Jewish population, the school reopened in 2002.

Media
Within Germany, Cologne is known as an important media centre. Several radio and television stations, including Westdeutscher Rundfunk (WDR), RTL and VOX, have their headquarters in the city. Film and TV production is also important. The city is "Germany's capital of TV crime stories". A third of all German TV productions are made in the Cologne region. Furthermore, the city hosts the Cologne Comedy Festival, which is considered to be the largest comedy festival in mainland Europe.

Sports

Cologne hosts 1. FC Köln, who play in the 1. Bundesliga. They play their home matches in RheinEnergieStadion which also hosted 5 matches of the 2006 FIFA World Cup. The International Olympic Committee and Internationale Vereinigung Sport- und Freizeiteinrichtungen e.V. gave RheinEnergieStadion a bronze medal for "being one of the best sporting venues in the world". Cologne also hosts FC Viktoria Köln 1904 and SC Fortuna Köln, who currently play in the 3. Liga (third division) and the Regionalliga West (fourth division) respectively.

The city is also home of the ice hockey team Kölner Haie, in the highest ice hockey league in Germany, the Deutsche Eishockey Liga. They are based at Lanxess Arena.

Several horse races per year are held at Cologne-Weidenpesch Racecourse since 1897, and the annual Cologne Marathon was started in 1997. Cologne also has a long tradition in rowing, being home of some of Germany's oldest regatta courses and boat clubs, such as the Kölner Rudergesellschaft 1891 in the Rodenkirchen district.

Japanese automotive manufacturer Toyota has their major motorsport facility known by the name Toyota Motorsport GmbH, which is located in the Marsdorf suburb, and is responsible for Toyota's major motorsport development and operations, which in the past included the FIA Formula One World Championship, the FIA World Rally Championship and the Le Mans Series. Currently they are working on Toyota's team (Toyota Gazoo Racing) which competes in the FIA World Endurance Championship.

Cologne is considered "the secret golf capital of Germany". The first golf club in North Rhine-Westphalia was founded in Cologne in 1906. The city offers the most options and top events in Germany.

The city has hosted several athletic events which includes the 2005 FIFA Confederations Cup, 2006 FIFA World Cup, 2007 World Men's Handball Championship, 2010 and 2017 Ice Hockey World Championships and 2010 Gay Games.

Since 2014, the city has hosted ESL One Cologne, one of the biggest CS GO tournaments held annually in July/August at Lanxess Arena.

Twin towns – sister cities

Cologne is twinned with:

 Barcelona, Spain (1984)
 Beijing, China (1987)
 Bethlehem, Palestine (1996)
 Cluj-Napoca, Romania (1976)
 Corinto, Nicaragua (1988)
 Cork, Ireland (1988)
 Esch-sur-Alzette, Luxembourg (1958)
 Indianapolis, United States (1988)
 Istanbul, Turkey (1997)
 Katowice, Poland (1991)
 Kyoto, Japan (1963)
 Liège, Belgium (1958)
 Lille, France (1958)
 Liverpool, England, United Kingdom (1952)
 Neukölln (Berlin), Germany (1967)
 El Realejo, Nicaragua (1988)
 Rio de Janeiro, Brazil (2011)
 Rotterdam, Netherlands (1958)
 Tel Aviv, Israel (1979)
 Thessaloniki, Greece (1988)
 Treptow-Köpenick (Berlin), Germany (1990)
 Tunis, Tunisia (1964)
 Turin, Italy (1958)
 Turku, Finland (1967)
 Volgograd, Russia (1988)

Cologne also cooperates with:
 Dnipro, Ukraine (2022)

See also

 Stadtwerke Köln, the municipal infrastructure company, operator of the city's railways, ports, and other utilities.
 New Year's Eve sexual assaults in Germany
 Hänneschen-Theater

References

External links

  

 
Cities in North Rhine-Westphalia
Populated places on the Rhine
Rhineland
Catholic pilgrimage sites
Holy cities
Members of the Hanseatic League
Coloniae (Roman)
Roman towns and cities in Germany
Germania Inferior
Free imperial cities
Populated places established in the 1st century BC
30s BC establishments
38 BC
Burial sites of the Pippinids
Holocaust locations in Germany